Eoghan McLaughlin is a Gaelic footballer who plays at club level for Westport and at senior level for the Mayo county team.

References

Living people
Mayo inter-county Gaelic footballers
Westport Gaelic footballers
Year of birth missing (living people)